Big Mountain is the high point on the Tuscarora Mountain ridge in south central Pennsylvania in the United States.  The  summit is located in the Buchanan State Forest and offers a viewshed that is one of the more stunning in the Commonwealth. 

Tuscarora Formation quartzite of the Silurian Age underlies the summit; it is this weather resistant rock which gives Big Mountain its high prominence. Big Mountain has the largest vertical rise in the Commonwealth of Pennsylvania, with over an 1800' difference between summit and the creek valley below on the east side of the mountain.

Big Mountain and the rest of the Tuscarora Ridge has abundant wildlife.  Black bear, white-tailed deer, a variety of bird species and its most notorious resident the timber rattlesnake can be found while hiking on the ridge.

The Tuscarora Trail passes along the ridge and over the summit, the nearby Cowans Gap State Park offers a variety of campsites, swimming, boating and hiking trails centered on a  lake.

Gallery

Further reading
 Alan R. Geyer (1979) "Outstanding Geologic Features of Pennsylvania", Geological Survey of Pennsylvania
 Charles H. Shultz (1999) "The Geology of Pennsylvania", Geological Survey of Pennsylvania

References

External links
 
 
 
 

Mountains of Pennsylvania
Landforms of Franklin County, Pennsylvania
Landforms of Fulton County, Pennsylvania